Canada (Minister of Employment and Immigration) v Chiarelli, [1992] 1 S.C.R. 711 is a leading Canadian case on the constitutionality of the deportation regime. The court held that the deportation a permanent resident who has violated a condition of admission to Canada does not violate any principle of fundamental justice under section 7 of the Canadian Charter of Rights and Freedoms.

Background
Joseph (Giuseppe) Chiarelli was born in Italy in 1960 and arrived in Canada in 1975. In November 1984 he pleaded guilty to unlawfully uttering threats to cause injury and to possession of narcotics for purpose of trafficking. He served six months in prison.

In 1986 he was called to a hearing based on his violation of his permanent residency status for his previous convictions.

Opinion of the Court
Justice Sopinka argued that the granting of permanent resident status was contractual in nature between the applicant and the state. "The most fundamental principle of immigration law is that non-citizens do not have an unqualified right to enter or remain in the country". Consequently, the state has the right to grant the privilege of enter, work, and access services of the country, and may grant them in exchange for conditions.

Aftermath
Reasoning has been criticized as children are equally bound despite them not consenting to the conditions. The argument for right to exclude was also criticized for its lack of consideration of international obligations such as duty against refoulement.

Notes

See also
 List of Supreme Court of Canada cases

External links
 

Supreme Court of Canada cases
Canadian immigration and refugee case law
Canadian Charter of Rights and Freedoms case law
1992 in Canadian case law
1992 in international relations